Cry Tough is a 1976 album from Nils Lofgren. The follow-up to his solo debut, Cry Tough is another offering of Lofgren-penned pop/rock. Notable for the title track and the songs "It's Not a Crime", "Mud In Your Eye" and "Can't Get Closer", "Cry Tough" also includes Al Kooper on keyboards.

The album charted on the US Billboard 200 for sixteen weeks and peaked at number 32 on June 5, 1976. On the UK albums chart, it peaked at number 8. No singles from the album charted in either country.

Track listing
All songs written by Nils Lofgren, except where noted.
 "Cry Tough" (Alton Ellis, E. Gordon, Winston Jarrett, Lofgren) – 5:07
 "It's Not a Crime" (Lofgren, Tom Lofgren) – 4:14
 "Incidentally It's Over" – 3:18
 "For Your Love" (Graham Gouldman) – 5:21
 "Share a Little" – 5:16
 "Mud in Your Eye" – 2:42
 "Can't Get Closer" – 3:45
 "You Lit a Fire" – 3:18
 "Jailbait" – 3:55

Charts

Personnel

Musicians
 Nils Lofgren – guitar, keyboards, vocals
 Tom Lofgren  – guitar, vocals (tracks 1–2, 4)
 Al Kooper – keyboards (tracks 1–2, 4, 8–9)
 Chuck Rainey – bass (tracks 1, 4, 8)
 Paul Stallworth – bass (tracks 2, 4, 9)
 Wornell Jones – bass, vocals (tracks 3, 5, 7)
 Jim Gordon – drums (tracks 1–2, 4, 8, 9)
 Aynsley Dunbar – drums (tracks 3, 5, 7)
 Scott Ball – upright bass (track 6)
 Holden Raphael – percussion (track 6)
 Emil Richards – percussion (tracks 1–2, 8)
 Dominic Frontiere – orchestral arrangements (tracks 2, 8)
 Ron Hicklin – backing vocals (tracks 1–2, 8–9)
 Billy Talbot, Ralph Molina – backing vocals (tracks 3,5)
 P.P. Arnold, Claudia Lennear, Buddy Miles – backing vocals (track 2)

Technical
 David Briggs – producer (tracks 3, 5–7)
 Al Kooper – producer (tracks 1–2, 4, 8–9)
 Bob Dawson, David DeVore, Bob Edwards, Lee Kiefer, Tim Mulligan – engineers
 John Henning, Deni King, Chris Morris, Chip Brown – assistant engineers
 Ed Caraeff – design, photography

References

1976 albums
Nils Lofgren albums
Albums produced by David Briggs (producer)
Albums produced by Al Kooper
A&M Records albums